Iran national field hockey team may refer to:

 Iran men's national field hockey team
 Iran women's national field hockey team